The ADtranz low floor tram was introduced in the 1990s as the world's first tram with a completely low floor design. This tram was developed by MAN for the Bremen urban transport system. The prototype, tram number 3801, was first publicly introduced on 9 February 1990. From 1991 to 1993, it was being tested in many European cities. Ten German cities have purchased this type. Adtranz took over the rail division of MAN in 1990.

The naming scheme is GTxN/M/S/K from German  (articulated propelled railcar) with x axles for a specific gauge ( - standard gauge,  - meter gauge,  - narrow gauge,  - cape gauge). Delivered models include the standard-gauge version that was named GT6N or GT8N  and the metre-gauge version that was called GT6M.

Adtranz low floor trams come in lengths of three or four modules, all of which are approximately the same length. Under each module lies a bogie; the low floor, however, constrains the bogie's movement. Two of the axles are  mechanically linked to the bogie truck by means of a universal joint. Characteristic of this tram is its ability to follow curves, which requires a special track layout. This  occurs when the first or last module drives through a curve and drags the other two modules (which are on the straight) after it.

First generation 

The company Hansa Waggonbau in Bremen had been among the first to introduce the concept of articulated railcars which had been delivered to customers with the GT4 model since 1959 (example) The fading interest in tram operation in the 1970s however led to a bankruptcy of the company in 1975. Renewed interest in the concept sprang up in the late 1980s with Bremen and Munich to look for modernized versions of the GT type series. This included the wish for a low floor variant and all rail cars to supply traction. MAN took over the task to create a test model (number 561) in 1985 which consisted of 3 units (instead of the 2 units of the GT4). The first model to be delivered (GT6N) was a three part electrical multiple unit (EMU) as well.

Tram operation includes:
 Augsburg: 12 GT6M
 Frankfurt (Oder): 8 GT6M
 Jena: 33 GT6M
 Mainz: 16 GT6M
 Zwickau: 12 GT6M
 Berlin: 150 GT6N
 Bremen: 78 GT8N
 Munich: 70 GT6N
 Norrköping: 4 GT6N (bought from Bremen and Munich)
 Nuremberg: 14 GT6N
 Kumamoto: 4 GT4N
 Braunschweig: 12 GT6S
 Takaoka: 4 GT4K
 Okayama: 1 GT4K
 Toyama: 7 GT4K
 Fukui: 12 GT6K, 2 GT4K

On the small tramnet in the Swedish city Norrköping there have been operating four second-hand Adtranz-tram services since the end of the millennium. The selection of stock consists of the prototype "Bremen" (tram 3801) and three units from Munich.

Berlin
On 20 October 1992, the framework conditions for the procurement of 120 trams were adopted. The first car with the number 1001 was delivered to the Berliner Verkehrsbetriebe (BVG) on 23 August 1994. As problems were encountered in the first passenger cars, the next scheduled deployment was not until 14 November 1994. The first series included 29 trams; The second series consisted of 41 trams. The third series consisted of 60 trams. The fourth series comprises 30 trams. The last unit had been delivered on the 2nd of April 2003. The last series had the following changes compared to the previous deliveries:
 Air conditioning extended to the passenger compartment
 Tinted windows in the passenger compartment
 Raised roof panel around the entire car
 Glass cab rear wall
 Fully glazed doors
 LCD - Train destination display 
 Cameras for video surveillance
 Sound absorbing mats in the entire underbody area
 Electrically height-adjustable foot switches in the driver's compartment

In February 2004 the tram Norrköping (Sweden) made the offer for 9 million euros for five units, two of which were of type GT6N and three of type GT6N-ZR. But Berlin rejected the sale.

Second generation 

The response on the Adtranz's second generation trams was not successful on the market. Only Munich and Nuremberg ordered this type. Aside from being updated with the latest technology, it also featured a larger distance between the axles (2 meters instead of 1.85 meter) so that the leg space on top of the bogies could be increased. Another difference is, that where the previous generation had technically been a false bidirectional unit, in that it technically consisted of two front lead for each end respectively, it is now a true singular bidirectional multiple-unit. In the middle, the articulation has been lengthened and redesigned, so that the movements of the front and rear sets of modules couldn't influence each other. Because of this, any notable "snaking" only occurs whilst going in or out of curves.

Tram operation includes:
 Munich: 20 GT8N
 Nuremberg: 26 GT8N

Successors 
When Bombardier Transportation bought Adtranz, it ceased production of the GTx-trams; however, the concept of articulated railcars for low floor trams was carried forward to its Incentro model, which was eventually replaced by Bombardier's standardized Flexity family of vehicles. Of these, the Flexity Berlin was specially designed with a layout similar to the Incentro and GTx-series and can be considered to be among its immediate successors. These trams entered revenue service in 2011.

Competing manufacturer Siemens Transportation Systems had been offering the Combino models with articulated railcars until some Combino construction flaws were observed. The new Avenio family of tram models features a double articulation joint similar to the second generation of ADtranz low floor trams. These have already been sold to Budapest and Almada (Portugal).

Similar trams are the Alstom Citadis, AnsaldoBreda Sirio and CAF Urbos, among others.

References

External links

short articulated trams

Adtranz
Tram vehicles of Germany
Tram vehicles of Sweden